Pure Soul was an American R&B girl group who were signed to Interscope Records in the mid 1990s. They are perhaps best known for their hit single We Must Be in Love, the debut single from their self-titled debut album. The "Pure Soul" album (the group's only album) scored three top forty hits on the US Billboard R&B chart. Their music videos were some of the most frequently played videos on BET, VH-1 and The Box at the time of their release. After the singles ran their course and faded from regular rotation, the group mysteriously disappeared from the music scene without any explanation.

Discography

Albums
 Pure Soul (1995)
Singles

External links
[] Album and singles info, chart info and music video links.

References

American girl groups
African-American girl groups